Saverio Valente (born January 24, 1962) is an Argentine former footballer who played as a midfielder.

Career 
Valente played in the Argentine Primera División in 1983 with Boca Juniors. He made his debut for Boca Juniors on September 21, 1983 against Club Atlético Huracán. In 1985, he played with Club Atlético Temperley. In 1990, he played in the National Soccer League with Toronto Italia.

References 

1962 births
Living people
Argentine footballers
Boca Juniors footballers
Club Atlético Temperley footballers
Argentine Primera División players
Toronto Italia players
Canadian National Soccer League players
Association football midfielders